Archeological Site No. LA 54021 is a prehistoric archaeological site in Hidalgo County, New Mexico. The site dates from the Animas phase, which spanned from 1200-1350 A.D. Adobe structures with at least 16 total rooms have been found at the site; these structures may represent a transitional phase between pit dwellings and larger Animas compounds. Six of these rooms are filled in with soil and retain their cobble foundations and parts of their adobe walls. The site also includes ceramic remains and some stone artifacts.

The site was added to the National Register of Historic Places on January 23, 1993.

See also

National Register of Historic Places listings in Hidalgo County, New Mexico

References

Archaeological sites on the National Register of Historic Places in New Mexico
Hidalgo County, New Mexico
National Register of Historic Places in Hidalgo County, New Mexico
Adobe buildings and structures in New Mexico